Holder may refer to:

Law
 Holder (law), a person that has in their custody a promissory note, bill of exchange or cheque
 Holder v Holder, an English trusts law case
 Holder v. Humanitarian Law Project (2010), a U.S. Supreme Court decision

People
 Holder (surname)
 Holder da Silva (born 1988), Guinea-Bissauan sprinter

Places
 Holder, Australian Capital Territory, a suburb of Canberra
 Holder, South Australia, a locality
 Holder, Florida, United States, an unincorporated community
 Holder, Illinois, United States, a town
 Holder Plantation, Jackson County, Georgia, United States, on the National Register of Historic Places
 Holder Peak, Princess Elizabeth Land, Antarctica

Ships
 , a US destroyer escort
 , a US destroyer

Other uses
 Holder (American football)
 Holder baronets, a title in the Baronetage of the United Kingdom

See also 
 Hölder (disambiguation)
 Holder Formation, a geologic formation in the Sacramento Mountains of New Mexico
 Holder 17, an American sailboat design
 Holder 20, an American sailboat design
 Hoelder
 
 
 Hold (disambiguation)